Olson (also Olsson, Oleson) is a common patronymic surname of Scandinavian origin that literally means "son of Olaf or Ole". Olson may refer to:

Academics
 Eric T. Olson (philosopher), American-born professor of philosophy at the University of Sheffield
 Hope A. Olson, library scholar known for her critical analyses of classification systems
 James C. Olson (1917–2005), American historian and 17th president of the University of Missouri System
 James S. Olson, American professor of history at Sam Houston State University
 Oscar L. Olson (1872–1956), third President of Luther College in Iowa

Artists and entertainers
 Alix Olson (born 1975), American poet
 Candice Olson (born 1964), Canadian interior designer and host of the home makeover show Divine Design with Candice Olson
 Charles Olson (1910–1970), American modernist poet
 Dante Pereira-Olson, American actor
 Evan Olson (born 1967), rock singer and songwriter
 James Olson (actor) (1930–2022), American actor
 Jenni Olson (born 1962), writer, director and documentary filmmaker
 Jody Jean Olson, also known as India Summer, US porno actress 
 John Olson (poet and writer) (born 1947)
 Johnny Olson (1910–1985), American radio personality and television announcer
 Kaitlin Olson (born 1975), American actress
 Mark Olson (musician) (born 1961), U.S. country singer-songwriter
 Martin Olson (born 1956) American comedy writer
 Nancy Olson (born 1928), American actress
 Olivia Olson (born 1992), American singer-songwriter and actress
 Scott Olson, guitarist, bassist, and recording engineer

Athletes
 Benji Olson (born 1975), former National Football League (NFL) player
 Bob Olson, American collegiate football player
 Carl Bobo Olson, (1928–2002), American boxer
 Dante Olson (born 1997), American football player
 Drew Olson (born 1983), NFL quarterback
 Greg Olson (baseball) (born 1960), Major League Baseball (MLB) catcher
 Gregg Olson (born 1966), MLB pitcher
 Josh Olson (born 1981), American ice hockey player
 Karl Olson (1930–2010), MLB outfielder
 Lute Olson (1934–2020), former basketball coach
 Matt Olson (born 1994), MLB first baseman
 Sasha Olson (born 1976), Canadian softball player
 Tyler Olson (baseball) (born 1989), American baseball player

Politicians and government officials
 Alec G. Olson (born 1930), American politician
 Allen I. Olson (born 1938), American politician
 Bud Olson (1925–2002), Canadian Member of Parliament, Senator and Lieutenant Governor
 Conrad P. Olson (1882-1952) American judge and politician
 Conrad Olson (Minnesota politician) (1895-1953), American politician and lawyer
 Culbert Olson, (1876–1962), American politician
 Donovan Olson (born 1965), American politician
 Edgar Olson (1937–2020), American politician
 Floyd B. Olson (1891–1936), American politician
 George W. Olson (1897-1958), American farmer and politician
 Kurt Olson (born 1948), American politician
 Mark Douglas Olson, American politician
 Mark W. Olson (1943–2018), American economist and bank executive 
 Ole H. Olson (1872–1954), American politician
 Pete Olson (born 1962), American politician
 Theodore Olson (born 1940), American politician
 William Olson (1873–1931), American politician

Scientists and engineers
 Everett C. Olson (1910–1993), American zoologist, paleontologist, and geologist
 Frank Olson, (1910–28, 1953), American biological warfare scientist
 Harry F. Olson (1901–1982), American acoustic engineer
 Jean Olson Lanjouw (1962–2005), American economist
 John Melvin Olson (1929–2017), American biochemist, pioneering researcher in photosynthesis
 Mancur Olson, Jr. (1932–1988), American economist and social scientist
 Storrs L. Olson (1944–2021), American biologist, ornithologist and avian paleontologist
 Cynthia Olson Reichhardt, American physicist

Soldiers
 Eric T. Olson (born 1952), American admiral and commander of U.S. Special Operations Command
 Magnus Olson (Swedish Army officer) (1929–2018)
 Norman E. Olson (1915–1944), U.S. Army Air Forces World War II flying ace
 Sven-Olof Olson (1926–2021), Swedish Air Force lieutenant general
 Truman O. Olson (1917–1944), U.S. Army soldier posthumously awarded the Medal of Honor

Writers and commentators
 Barbara Olson (1955–2001), television commentator, 9/11 victim, wife of Theodore Olson
 Lisa Olson, American sportswriter
 Sigurd F. Olson (1899–1982), American author and environmentalist
 Walter Olson (born 1954), author and blogger

Playboy Playmates
 Gale Olson (born 1947)
 Hope Olson (born 1956) List of Playboy Playmates of 1976#October
 Kalin Olson (born 1975)

Other
 Annette Olson, Miss North Dakota 2006
 Arthur David Olson, founding contributor of the tz database
 Clifford Olson (1940–2011), Canadian serial killer
 Dwight C. Olson (late 20th c.), founder of Data Securities International
 Jim Olson, Seattle architect
 Michael Fors Olson (born 1966), American Catholic bishop
 Norman Olson (born 1946) is an American militia movement activist
 Sara Jane Olson, former member of the Symbionese Liberation Army

See also
 Olson (disambiguation)
 Olsen (surname)
 Olsson

Patronymic surnames